Jadu Prasanna Bhattacharjee was an Indian politician and a member of the Tripura Legislative Assembly from Khowai Assembly constituency in 1972 election.

References

Tripura politician stubs